Jujubinus maldivensis is a species of sea snail, a marine gastropod mollusk in the family Trochidae, the top snails.

Description
The height of an adult shell attains 12.5 mm. The species shows a large range of variability. Some specimens are nearly typical, others are typical in painting, but with white flames on a purple ground, or of a uniform green, shaded with yellow, with or without the spotted band at the base of each whorl. In most specimens the colour is mixed with yellow granules, and sometimes also with nearly black ones. The sculpture is somewhat coarse. Only visible under a lens, one can observe between the rows of granules,  a few fine, spiral, elevated striae, 1 to 3 in each interstice of the body whorl, crossed by oblique, slightly lamellose striae. On the base of the shell one can observe also one distinct, and often 1 or 2 very small intermediate, lirae, and also less crowded oblique striae.

Distribution
This marine species occurs off the Maldives, Indo-Malaysia and in the Central and East Indian Ocean.

References

External links
 Smith (1903) The Fauna and Geography of the Maldive and Laccadive Archip. Vol. II, part 2. Marine Mollusca, p. 617, PI. 35, fig. 25, 26.
 Herbert D.G. (2015). An annotated catalogue and bibliography of the taxonomy, synonymy and distribution of the Recent Vetigastropoda of South Africa (Mollusca). Zootaxa. 4049(1): 1-98

maldivensis
Gastropods described in 1903